Tryambak Shankar Shejwalkar (T S Shejwalkar; Devanagari: त्र्यंबक शंकर शेजवलकर, त्र्यं. शं. शेजवलकर) (25 May 1895 – 28 November 1963) was an Indian award-winning historian and essayist.

Biography
Shejwalkar was born in Kasheli, a village in Rajapur Taluka of Ratnagiri district. He passed matriculation examination in 1911 from a school run by the Aryan education society. Later he completed a Bachelor of Arts at Wilson College, Mumbai.

His first job was in military accounts department from May 1918 to June 1921. He worked in Deccan College from August 1939 until 25 May 1955. Despite his retirement, he continued to work at Deccan College until his death.

He was associated with Bharat Itihas Sanshodhak Mandal from 1918 onwards. There he came in contact with other historians like Datto Vaman Potdar, Govind Sakharam Sardesai and Dattopant Apte.

Professional history
Shejwalkar primarily wrote in the Marathi language, and was the founder-editor of now defunct Marathi periodical Pragati (1929–1932). Shejwalkar was also the Reader of Maratha History at Deccan College from 1939-1955. Shejwalkar's topics included historical, sociological and contemporary issues ranging from Vijayanagara Empire to Mahatma Gandhi, Marathi speaking poet-saints to decay of Brahminism and the work of Arnold J. Toynbee.

Shejwalkar claimed that he ghostwrote G S Sardesai's book "Nanasaheb Peshwa".

His biggest regret at the time of his death was that he could not complete the biography of Chatrapati Shivaji Maharaj.

Essays
Shejwalkar wrote essays on life and work of Swami Dayananda Saraswati, Mahadev Govind Ranade, Kashinath Trimbak Telang, Swami Vivekananda, Gopal Ganesh Agarkar, Bal Gangadhar Tilak, Lala Lajpat Rai, Bhagat Singh, Rajguru, Sukhdev, Vishwanath Kashinath Rajwade, Shridhar Venkatesh Ketkar among many others.

Third Battle of Panipat
Shejwalkar was the first historian to study the Third Battle of Panipat in great detail, personally traveling to all places relevant to the battle. He argues that the battle was fought to save the Mughal Empire and that the Marathas were sacrificed for the cause of Timur's successors. He further argues that if Jawaharlal Nehru had shown willingness for similar sacrifice, India may not have been divided in 1947.

Authorship
 "Tryambak Shankar Shejwalkar- Nivadak Lekhsangrah" by T S Shejwalkar (collection- H V Mote, Introduction- G D Khanolkar) 1977 (Marathi)
 Panipat 1761: Deccan College Publication, Pune 1946
 Nagpur Affairs, Part I: Deccan College Publication, Pune 1954
 Nagpur Affairs, Part II: Deccan College Publication, Pune 1959
 Panipat 1761  : Joshi Ani Lokhande Prakashan, Pune, 1961 (Marathi)
 Dattopant Apte-Vyakti Darshan, 1945 (Marathi)
 Nijam-Peshwe Sambandh, 1959 (Marathi)
 Kokanchya Itihasachi Parshvabhumi, 1961 (Marathi)
 Shiv Chhatrapati: Sankalpit Shivcharitrachi Prastavana, Arakhada va sadhane, 1964 (Marathi)

Further reading
 "Tryambak Shankar Shejwalkar: Vyaktitva ani Kartutva 1895-1963", 1995 (Marathi) Editor Sarojini Vaidya "त्र्यंबक शंकर शेजवलकर: व्यक्तित्व आणि कर्तृत्व 1895-1963" संपादक: सरोजिनी वैद्य

References

External links
 Books Authored by Tryambak Shankar Shejwalkar
 Books that reference Tryambak Shankar Shejwalkar
 Commentary on some of Shejwalkar's work

Marathi people
Indian male essayists
Marathi-language writers
20th-century Indian historians
1895 births
1963 deaths
Recipients of the Sahitya Akademi Award in Marathi
People from Ratnagiri district
University of Mumbai alumni
20th-century Indian essayists
Writers from Maharashtra